Hoita is a small genus of legumes containing three species. They bear attractive purple or fuchsia flowers in large inflorescences similar to those of kudzu. They are known commonly as scurfpeas or leather-roots and are closely related to the psoraleas. They are found almost exclusively in California.

External links
USDA Plants Profile
Jepson Manual Treatment
Photo gallery

Psoraleeae
Flora of California
Fabaceae genera